IFAC may refer to:
 International Fine Arts College, now renamed to the Miami International University of Art & Design.
 International Fine Arts Consortium, the independent curatorial platform in New York.
 International Federation of Accountants, founded in 1977.
 International Federation of Automatic Control
 Irish Fiscal Advisory Council, Irish statutory body overseeing compliance with EU rules.

Regulatory body